USS De Soto is a name used more than once by the U.S. Navy:

  was a Navy steamer that served during the American Civil War and in the West Indies.
  was a riverboat that was renamed General Lyon on 24 October 1862.

See also

 

United States Navy ship names